Purwakarta Regency is a landlocked regency (kabupaten) of West Java, Indonesia. The town of Purwakarta is its capital.

The area of the Regency is 971.72 km2, and it had a population of 852,521 in the 2010 Census and 997,869 in the 2020 Census, while the official estimate as at mid 2021 was 1,011,466 for a density of 1,040.9 people per km2.

Administrative districts
The Purwakarta Regency is divided into seventeen districts (kecamatan), listed below with their areas and their populations at the 2010 Census and 2020 Census, together with the official estimates as at mid 2021. The table also gives the locations of the district administrative centres, the number of villages (rural desa and urban kelurahan) in each distrioct, and its post code.

The 192 villages comprise 183 classed as rural desa and 9 classed as urban kelurahan - the latter are 9 of the 10 villages in Purwakarta (town) District.

Toll Road Access

Harmoni Award 2016
Religion Ministry has awarded Harmoni Award 2016 to Purwakarta Regency due to religion tolerance in this area. It is the only one award from 10 awards across Indonesia, although West Java Province is categorized by Setara Institute as the best of tolerance in Indonesia. West Java Province itself has got nothing.

References

External links